Assétou Kolga (born April 24, 1988) is an Ivorian female professional basketball player.

External links
Profile at afrobasket.com

1988 births
Living people
Sportspeople from Abidjan
Ivorian women's basketball players
Point guards
Shooting guards